The 1926 Michigan gubernatorial election was held on November 2, 1926. Republican nominee Fred W. Green defeated Democratic nominee William Comstock with 63.35% of the vote.

General election

Candidates
Major party candidates
Fred W. Green, Republican
William Comstock, Democratic 
Other candidates
Frank E. Titus, Prohibition
William Reynolds, Workers

Results

References

1926
Michigan
Gubernatorial
November 1926 events